Dark Seed or Darkseed may refer to:

 Dark Seed (video game), a 1992 horror adventure game
 Dark Seed II, a 1995 sequel to the 1992 adventure game
 Darkseed (band), a German gothic metal band formed in 1992
 Dark Seed, an Australian indigenous music group managed by Vibe Australia
 Dark Seed, a DeBeers story by V. C. Andrews
 The Dark Seed, a book based on the role-playing game Savage Worlds

See also 
 Darkseid, a fictional character in DC Comics